Paul Cook (May 5, 1863 - May 25, 1905) was a professional baseball player. He played all or part of seven seasons in Major League Baseball, between 1884 and 1891, for the Philadelphia Quakers, Louisville Colonels, Brooklyn Ward's Wonders, and St. Louis Browns, primarily as a catcher.

Sources

Major League Baseball catchers
Philadelphia Quakers players
Louisville Colonels players
Brooklyn Ward's Wonders players
St. Louis Browns (AA) players
Muskegon (minor league baseball) players
Washington Nationals (minor league) players
Toledo Avengers players
Lincoln Rustlers players
Baseball players from New York (state)
19th-century baseball players
1863 births
1905 deaths
People from Caledonia, New York